Anatoly Fomich Sass (born 22 December 1935) is a Russian rower who competed for the Soviet Union in the 1964 Summer Olympics and in the 1968 Summer Olympics.

He was born in Moscow.

At the 1964 Olympics, he was a crew member of the Soviet boat which finished seventh in the coxless four event. Sass stood in for the single sculls champion who was suffering from illness, Vyacheslav Ivanov, at the 1965 European Rowing Championships, where he won the silver medal. At the 1968 Olympics, he and his partner Aleksandr Timoshinin won the gold medal in the double sculls event.

References

External links
 

1935 births
Living people
Russian male rowers
Soviet male rowers
Olympic rowers of the Soviet Union
Rowers at the 1964 Summer Olympics
Rowers at the 1968 Summer Olympics
Olympic gold medalists for the Soviet Union
Olympic medalists in rowing
Medalists at the 1968 Summer Olympics
European Rowing Championships medalists